Fabrizio Dragosei (born 1950) is an Italian journalist and writer. Born in Rome, with a degree in Political Sciences at the University of Rome, writes for Corriere della Sera from Moscow. Dragosei has worked for the Italian television (Rai) from London, for the daily Corriere d'Informazione and for the weekly magazine Panorama. He joined Corriere della Sera as an economic journalist in 1973. Dragosei has been Head of the Rome economic section for ten years and a special correspondent for foreign affairs.
He has written "Stelle del Cremlino", a History of Russia under Boris Yeltsin, Vladimir Putin and Dmitri Medvedev, "Così parlò Hitler", the History of Nazism in the words of Adolf Hitler. In 2017, Dragosei has co-authored "Ottobre rosso", a book on the 100 years from the Russian Revolution. In 2018, the journalist has published "La rivoluzione russa e la fine dei Romanov" a story of the 17 months between the first Russian Revolution of February 1917 and the murder of the Imperial Family in July 1918 Dragosei is also a certified mid-mountain guide from Alto Adige-Suedtirol Collegio provinciale guide alpine Alto Adige Landesberufskammer der Berg und Skifueher Suedtirol, elenco speciale Accompagnatore media montagna n.765

References

Italian journalists
Italian male journalists
Living people
Writers from Rome
1950 births